Simon Procter (born 8 November 1968 in Lancashire, England) is an expatriate British artist and photographer who has collaborated with Karl Lagerfeld, John Galliano and Vivienne Westwood, and whose work includes Galliano Royal.

Art

His work has appeared in V Magazine, Vogue, Harper's Bazaar, The New York Times''' T Magazine, The Independent, The Daily Telegraph magazine, Bullett, Stiletto and Sport and Style''.

His artwork is held in collections and museums worldwide, and has been shown at Paris's Grand Palais, the Boston Museum of Fine Art, Art Basel Miami and the Moscow Museum of Art.

Since 2005, he has worked as a photographer, shooting international campaigns for Nike, Reebok, Nokia, Adidas and Hilfiger, among others, represented by the Jed Root Agency. In Britain, he is known for his work with Royal Ascot.

Life

Procter was born in Lancashire, Northern England, and grew up in Royston, a small mining village in South Yorkshire.

He studied fine art, specializing in painting and sculpture, and holds a BA in Fine Art (Honors) from Nottingham Trent University. 
 
Procter currently lives between Paris, New York and a farmhouse in northern France. He has two children, his son Loup and his daughter Brune.

References

External links
Agency biography, catalogue of work

1968 births
Living people